King Fahad Air Base (Arabic: قاعدة الملك فهد الجوية) (ICAO: OETF) (KFAB) is a Royal Saudi Air Force military base located in Taif, Saudi Arabia.

Overview
Operational Aircraft:

Eurofighter Typhoon -

72 ordered, of which all have been delivered as of December 2021.

-No. 3 Squadron-

-No. 10 Squadron-

-No. 80 Squadron-

See also 

List of military installations in Saudi Arabia

References

Airports in Saudi Arabia
Military installations of Saudi Arabia